Land reclamation is done in Monaco  because land is very scarce, as the country is comparatively tiny, at . To solve this problem and to continue economic development, for years the country has been adding to its total land area by reclaiming land from the sea.

Geography

The entire district of Fontvieille was constructed on land reclaimed from the sea in the western part of Monaco in the 1970s. It is the newest of the four traditional quartiers (districts) in the principality of Monaco, and one of ten Wards for modern administrative purposes.

Land has also been added to areas of La Condamine and Larvotto/Bas Moulins.

History

Prince Albert's father, Rainier III, was known as the "Builder Prince". In an attempt to further develop the economy of Monaco, he first supported the idea of land reclamation. Since it was impossible to extend into France, the only solution was to reclaim land from the sea. First, the Larvotto beach district was created in the early 1960s, then the Fontvieille industrial area, increasing the principality's surface area by approximately 20 percent. More recently, Port Hercules has been extended to welcome larger cruise ships on one side, and to provide land for a new Yacht Club on the other.

Projects

Le Portier

Le Portier, also known as Portier Cove, is the main land reclamation project in Monaco as of 2020. The reclamation itself has been completed but the land is still undeveloped and is planned to be fully completed in 2025.

Others
Prince Albert II is currently planning to reclaim even more land. He intends to build into the Mediterranean to create a new area about 5 hectares (12.5 acres) in size. The new district will extend from the Fontvieille district at the western foot of the Rock of Monaco, where Monaco's palace and historic centre are situated. The project will cost an estimated €11 billion. It was suspended in 2009 due to the global financial crisis and the Prince's concerns regarding the marine environment, but the project was resumed in 2010 and was planned to be completed by 2014. However, as of 2021, it has yet to be finished.

Issues
Monaco's coastline on the Mediterranean is already a fragile and vulnerable environment. Any further land reclamation projects threaten to disturb or damage the coastal ecosystem. Monaco's leaders have approached the prospect of further land reclamation with caution and have stated that new projects would have to meet strict environmental standards to limit damage to flora and wildlife. Due to the concerns that land reclamation could potentially damage local marine ecosystems, Prince Albert II has insisted the entire expansion be placed on stilts, like an oil rig, in order to disturb the sea floor as little as possible.

See also
 Land reclamation in Hong Kong
 Land reclamation in the UAE

References

Geography of Monaco
Land reclamation
Coastal engineering
Water and the environment